The Upa is a river in Tula Oblast, Russia, and one of the main tributaries of the Oka.

The city of Tula is situated on its banks. The name of the river is of Baltic origin.

References 

Rivers of Tula Oblast